I Am Mary Dunne is a novel, first published in 1968,  by Northern Irish-Canadian writer Brian Moore about one day in the life of a beautiful and well-to-do 31-year-old Canadian woman living in New York City with her third husband, a successful playwright. Triggered by seemingly unimportant occurrences, the protagonist / first person narrator remembers her past in a series of flashbacks, which reveal her insecurities, her bad conscience concerning her first two husbands, and her fear that she is on the brink of insanity.

I Am Mary Dunne has been described as "perhaps [Brian Moore's] best book". Robert Fulford, writing in Canada's The Globe and Mail, calls it "[a] feminist novel written before the wave of feminist novels began".

In its original draft, I Am Mary Dunne was called A Woman of No Identity.

References

Further reading
 Brady, Charles A. "I Am Mary Dunne" in Eire-Ireland 3, Winter 1968, pp. 136–40.
 Dorenkamp, J H. "Finishing the day: Nature and Grace in Two Novels by Brian Moore" in Eire-Ireland 13, Spring 1978, pp. 103–112.

1968 British novels
1968 Canadian novels
Jonathan Cape books
New Canadian Library
Novels by Brian Moore (novelist)
Novels set in New York City
Novels set in one day